Tamara Nikolaevna Nizhnikova (9 March 1925 – 15 February 2018) was a Belarusian opera singer.

Born in Samara on 9 March 1925, Nizhnikova attended the Moscow Conservatory before joining what later became National Opera and Ballet of Belarus. Prior to her retirement in 1976, Nizhnikova was awarded the Order of the Red Banner of Labour, and named a People's Artist of the USSR. She later received the Order of Friendship of Peoples, and the Order of Francysk Skaryna.

References

1925 births
2018 deaths
Soviet women opera singers
Musicians from Samara, Russia
Recipients of the Order of Francysk Skaryna
Recipients of the Order of Friendship of Peoples
People's Artists of the USSR
Moscow Conservatory alumni
Soviet sopranos